INS Khukri was the lead vessel of her class of corvettes, in service with the Indian Navy. The ship was named after INS Khukri, the only Indian Navy ship to be ever lost in combat.

Khukri was laid down on 27 September 1985 at Mazagon Dock Limited, launched on 3 December 1986 and commissioned on 23 August 1989.

In 2022, it was stated to be developed into a museum ship and placed at INS Khukri Memorial, Diu. On the 26th of January 2022, the warship was formally handed over to the administration of Diu district to be converted into a memorial.

Service History
Khukri the lead ship of the class was decommissioned after 32 years of service on 23 December, 2021. During her service, the ship was commanded by 28 commanding officers and traversed a distance of over 6,44,897 nautical miles, which is equivalent to navigating around the world 30 times or three times the distance between the earth and the moon.

References

Khukri-class corvettes
Corvettes of the Indian Navy
Naval ships of India
1986 ships
Ships built in India
Museum ships in India